Macarius Magnes is the author of an apology against a Neo-Platonic philosopher of the early part of the fourth century, contained in a manuscript of the fifteenth century discovered at Athens in 1867 and edited by C. Blondel (Paris, 1876). This work (called  in Greek; Apocriticus in Latin) agrees in its dogmatics with Gregory of Nyssa, and is valuable on account of the numerous excerpts from the writings of the opponent of Macarius. These fragments are apparently drawn from the lost Against the Christians of Porphyry or from the Lover of Truth of Hierocles. 

He may be the Macarius, bishop of Magnesia, who, at the Synod of the Oak in 403, brought charges against Heraclides, bishop of Ephesus, the friend of John Chrysostom, although Adolf Harnack dated him in the late third century.

Like Macarius the Younger, this Macarius is frequently confused with Macarius of Egypt.

References

Sources
A. Capone, "The narrative sections of Macarius Magnes’ Apocriticus", in Lessico, argomentazioni e strutture retoriche nella polemica di età cristiana (III-V sec.), a c. di A. Capone, Turnhout 2012, pp. 253-270 .

Macarius Magnes: Apocriticus at Tertullian.org

External links
Apocriticus translated by  T. W. Crafer
__notoc__

4th-century Christian theologians
4th-century bishops in Roman Anatolia
4th-century writers